Damien Pasini (born 22 July 1984 in Bouches-du-Rhône, Miramas) is a French racing driver. He has competed in such single-seater series as Formula Renault V6 Eurocup, Formula Renault 2000 Eurocup and World Series by Nissan. Pasini has also raced in the FIA GT Championship and 2008–09 Speedcar Series season.

Racing record

Complete Formula Renault 3.5 Series results 
(key) (Races in bold indicate pole position) (Races in italics indicate fastest lap)

† Driver did not finish the race, but was classified as he completed more than 90% of the race distance.

References

External links
 Official website
 

1984 births
Living people
Sportspeople from Bouches-du-Rhône
French racing drivers
Italian Formula Renault 2.0 drivers
Formula Renault Eurocup drivers
Formula Renault V6 Eurocup drivers
FIA GT Championship drivers
World Series Formula V8 3.5 drivers
24 Hours of Spa drivers

Victory Engineering drivers
Cram Competition drivers
AF Corse drivers